Samachai Trangjaroenngarm (born 9 November 1953) is a Thai fencer. He competed in the team épée and sabre events at the 1976 Summer Olympics.

References

External links
 

1953 births
Living people
Samachai Trangjaroenngarm
Samachai Trangjaroenngarm
Fencers at the 1976 Summer Olympics
Samachai Trangjaroenngarm
Samachai Trangjaroenngarm